Ignacio Noguer Carmona (13 January 1931 – 3 October 2019) was a Spanish Roman Catholic bishop.

Noguer Carmona was born in Seville, Spain and was ordained to the priesthood in 1956. He served as bishop of the Roman Catholic Diocese of Guadix, Spain from 1976 to 1990. He then served as coadjutor bishop of the Roman Catholic Diocese of Huelva, Spain from 1990 to 1993 and was bishop of the Huelva Diocese from 1993 to 2006.

Notes

1931 births
2019 deaths
21st-century Roman Catholic bishops in Spain
20th-century Roman Catholic bishops in Spain